Taylor Township is a township in Lawrence County, Pennsylvania, United States. The population was nine hundred and ninety-one at the time of the 2020 census, a decline from the figure of one thousand fifty-two that was tabulated in 2010.

Geography
According to the United States Census Bureau, the township has a total area of 5.3 square miles (13.9 km2), of which 5.1 square miles (13.2 km2) is land and 0.2 square miles (0.6 km2), or 4.67%, is water. 

Unincorporated communities in the township include West Pittsburg, East Moravia, and New Castle Junction.

Demographics
As of the census of 2000, there were one thousand one hundred and ninety-eight people, four hundred and seventy-four households and three hundred and thirty-five families residing in the township. 

The population density was 234.9 people per square mile (90.7/km2). There were five hundred and six housing units at an average density of 99.2/sq mi (38.3/km2). 

The racial makeup of the township was 97.58% White, 1.59% African American, 0.33% Native American, 0.33% from other races, and 0.17% from two or more races. Hispanic or Latino of any race were 0.33% of the population.

There were four hundred and seventy-four households, out of which 23.4% had children under the age of eighteen living with them; 55.1% were married couples living together, 11.4% had a female householder with no husband present, and 29.3% were non-families. 24.7% of all households were made up of individuals, and 12.0% had someone living alone who was sixty-five years of age or older.

The average household size was 2.38 and the average family size was 2.83.

In the township the population was spread out, with 17.9% under the age of eighteen, 6.6% from eighteen to twenty-four, 24.2% from twenty-five to forty-four, 28.0% from forty-five to sixty-four, and 23.4% who were sixty-five years of age or older. The median age was forty-six years. 

For every one hundred females there were 91.1 males. For every one hundred females aged eighteen and over, there were 90.0 males.

The median income for a household in the township was $34,511, and the median income for a family was $39,375. Males had a median income of $31,688 compared with that of $19,167 for females. 

The per capita income for the township was $15,368. 

Roughly 9.7% of families and 12.1% of the population were below the poverty line, including 21.7% of those under age 18 and 7.7% of those age 65 or over.

References

Populated places established in 1770
Townships in Lawrence County, Pennsylvania
1770 establishments in Pennsylvania